Josh Cockroft (born February 6, 1989) is an American politician who served as a member of the Oklahoma House of Representatives for the 27th district from 2010 to 2018.

References

1989 births
Living people
Republican Party members of the Oklahoma House of Representatives